Rao Bahadur V. Appasamy Vandayar is an Indian politician and head of the Poondi estate in the Thanjavur district of Tamil Nadu, India. He belongs to prominent Kallar community. He was an ardent Justice partyman and was elected to 1920 Madras Presidency Legislative Council election in 1920.

Personal life
Vandayar had two son's, the name of  Rao Bahadur Shri.A. Veeriya Vandayar and Shri.A.Krishnaswamy Vandayar.

References

People from Thanjavur district